The Al-Ameer English School is an English medium school that was founded in 1991 in Ajman, United Arab Emirates.  The school is accredited by Central Board of Secondary Education, New Delhi and has the recognition of the U.A.E.'s Ministry of Education.

The school first opened in 1991 in a villa in Rumaila, Ajman. Unfortunately, In 2004 the school moved to its present spacious campus. The school grew over the years to have sections for KG, Primary and Secondary education. Male and female students have separate instruction.

The principal, Mr. S.J Jacob, received best teacher award from President Of India in 2014.

The school has a line of records to its credit in achieving 100% results in Grade X and XII Board Examinations.

The school has a course curriculum structured by the CBSE Board for Secondary and Higher Secondary. From Kindergarten to class XII, it admits pupils in various classes in each of its academic years. The academic session of Al-Ameer English School starts from the month of April. The admission criteria differ according to the class in which a particular student wishes to get admitted. An admission test is generally conducted by the school authority to admit the students in various classes. The school is affiliated to the CBSE Delhi Board and approved by the ministry of Education, UAE.  English is the common medium of teaching in Al-Ameer school. Malayalam, Hindi, Urdu and Arabic (replacing Urdu grade 9 onwards) are offered as second languages in the school.

References

External links
Al Ameer English School

Schools in the Emirate of Ajman